DCR may refer to:

Computing 
 .dcr, a raw image format
 Decision Composite Residuosity in cryptography, see Computational hardness assumption
 Design Change request, also Document Change request and Database Change request
 Device control register, a hardware register that controls some computer hardware device like a peripheral or an expansion card

Railways 
 DCRail, a British freight operating company
 Delmarva Central Railroad, a short-line railroad serving Delaware, Maryland, and Virginia on the Delmarva Peninsula 
 Dubois County Railroad, a Class III short-line railroad serving Dubois County in southern Indiana, United States

Engineering 
 DC Resistance of an inductor, see Equivalent series resistance
 Direct-conversion receiver
 Dynamic compression ratio, referring to the compression ratio of a combustion engine

Other 
 Dacryocystorhinostomy, a surgical procedure to restore the flow of tears into the nose
 Dale Coyne Racing, an American auto racing team
 Debt Coverage Ratio, another term for Debt service coverage ratio (DSCR)
 Digital cable ready, indicating that a television is capable of receiving cable TV without a set-top box
 Deglaciation Climate Reversal, see Younger Dryas
 Department of Conservation and Recreation (Massachusetts), a state agency best known for its parks and parkways
 Diploma of the College of Radiographers, abbreviated as DC(R), a qualification that was formerly awarded by the College of Radiographers, see Society and College of Radiographers
 Distributed Constraint Reasoning, see Distributed constraint optimization
 Division CuiRassée, a French armoured division in the Battle of France in 1940, see List of French divisions in World War II#Cavalry, mechanized and armoured divisions
 Dropped Call Rate, a term in telecommunications denoting the percentage of calls which due to technical reasons were cut off before the speaking parties had finished their conversation and before one of them had hung up
 Dual Cycle Rifle, a NATO calibre revolver-type assault rifle
 Durham College Rowing, an organization representing all college boat clubs in Durham University
 Dynamic contrast ratio, referring to the contrast ratio property of a display system
 ISO 639-3 code for the extinct language Negerhollands.